The FG-15 (AKA DFH-2 AKM and SpaB-170) was a Chinese spin stabilized apogee kick motor burning HTPB. It was developed by China Hexi Chemical and Machinery Corporation (also known as the 6th Academy of CASIC) for use in the Dong Fang Hong 2 satellite bus for insertion into GSO orbit.

This motor introduced a series of innovations for the Chinese solid motor industry: first use of glass fibre wound cases, carbon/carbon nozzle throat insert material, contoured divergent nozzle, and non-destructive test of the motor grain.

The initial version had the manufacturing code FG-15 was associated to the DFH-2 bus and flew twice. The FG-15B was used by the DFH-2A bus and flew five times.

See also
 China Hexi Chemical and Machinery Corporation
 Dong Fang Hong 2
 Long March 3

References

Rocket engines of China
Solid-fuel rockets